Biblia Hebraica may refer to:
The texts of the Hebrew Bible
The Jewish canon specifically, see Tanakh
Editions of the Masoretic Text of the Tanakh
Biblia Hebraica (Kittel) (BHK), 1906, 1913, 1937, the three editions of the Hebrew Bible edited by Rudolf Kittel (BHK)
Biblia Hebraica Stuttgartensia (BHS), 1968–1976; 1997
Biblia Hebraica Quinta (BHQ), 2004–(est. 2020)